Pinnacle Entertainment may refer to:

 Pinnacle Entertainment, a defunct gaming and hospitality company based in the Las Vegas Valley, Nevada
 Pinnacle Entertainment (United Kingdom), a defunct entertainment group based in the United Kingdom
 Pinnacle Entertainment Group, an American publisher of role-playing games and wargames